George Stephen may refer to:

 George Stephen (abolitionist) (1794–1879), English-born anti-slavery advocate, lived in Australia from 1855
 George Milner Stephen (1812–1894), Australian politician, member of the  South Australian Legislative Council and later, the Victorian Legislative Assembly
 George Stephen, 1st Baron Mount Stephen (1829–1921), Canadian banker and railway executive
 George A. Stephen (c.1922–1993), American inventor, entrepreneur, and the founder of Weber-Stephen Products Co.

See also

George Stephens (disambiguation)